Omphaliaster is a genus of fungi in the family Tricholomataceae. The widespread genus contains seven species, predominantly in northern temperate regions.

See also

List of Tricholomataceae genera

References

Tricholomataceae
Agaricales genera